General Paine may refer to:

Charles Jackson Paine (1833–1916), Union Army brigadier general
Eleazer A. Paine (1815–1882), Union Army brigadier general
Godfrey Paine (1871–1932), Royal Air Force major general; also a Royal Navy admiral
Halbert E. Paine (1826–1905), Union Army brigadier general and brevet major general

See also
Rollo Pain (1921–2005), British Army lieutenant general
William Pain (1855–1924), British Army brigadier general
General Payne (disambiguation)